Bernie Wagenblast (born September 1, 1956, in Elizabeth, New Jersey) is a transportation journalist and voice-over artist. She is the founder and editor of the Transportation Communications Newsletter. The newsletter originated as a discussion group in June 1998, evolving into its current format shortly thereafter.  She also edits The AASHTO Daily Transportation Update, published by the American Association of State Highway and Transportation Officials, and hosts AASHTO's ETAP Podcast and the ITE Talks Transportation podcast for the Institute of Transportation Engineers.

Early life
Wagenblast has been a lifelong resident of Cranford, New Jersey and attended Cranford High School. She then went on to graduate from Seton Hall University where she was active in the college's radio station, WSOU (South Orange, NJ), serving as the news director there in 1976–1977, and station manager in 1977–1978. In 2016 she was inducted into WSOU's Hall of Fame.

Career
Wagenblast is the founder and editor of the Transportation Communications Newsletter. She also has served as the voice for various transportation facilities including AirTrain Newark, AirTrain JFK, New York City Subway, and the travelers' information station system at Newark Liberty International Airport and John F. Kennedy International Airport. As of May 28, 2015, she can be heard as the voice on the refurbished cars running on the PATCO Speedline. She is the voice of the PATH customer information line as well as the main phone number for the Port Authority of New York and New Jersey. On July 4, 2004, she was the announcer during the laying of the cornerstone of One World Trade Center at the World Trade Center site.

Wagenblast was a traffic reporter for the New York City office of Shadow Traffic/Metro Networks (a Westwood One company), where she began her career in the transportation field in 1979 as one of that company's original on-air reporters. Through her work for Shadow, she appeared on several New York City radio stations over a five-year period, including WINS and WABC. On WABC she used the name Jack Packard, which was given to her by the station's morning DJ Dan Ingram when Wagenblast began airing traffic reports on the station in December 1979. The name was based on a character from the old time radio program "I Love a Mystery". In addition to New York City, Wagenblast also appeared on suburban stations WBAB, WERA, WMTR, WNAB, WVIP, and WWDJ.

Other broadcast experience included positions at WHN (New York City), WJDM (Elizabeth, NJ), WDGS (New Albany, IN) and WRNJ (Hackettstown, NJ).

After working for Shadow Traffic the first time, Wagenblast joined the New York City Department of Transportation, where she helped to establish the city's first transportation communications center. Afterward, she moved to the Port Authority of New York and New Jersey and was operations manager at TRANSCOM, a coalition of transportation agencies in New York, New Jersey and Connecticut. She also was involved in the start of the I-95 Corridor Coalition, serving as co-chair of the Highway Operations Group.

Following over a decade of work in government, Wagenblast rejoined the private sector serving as the NYC Director of Operations for SmartRoute Systems, a Senior Associate for TransCore and working with SmartRoute Systems to help grow their public sector Intelligent Transportation Systems business.

Wagenblast returned to WINS in April 2008, doing traffic reports in the early afternoon hours. She called her 23-year absence from the station a "lunch break" and one of the longest absences in the history of the New York media market. In addition, she was heard on WKXW and WRCN-FM. She worked for Total Traffic in Rutherford, New Jersey.

Personal life 
Wagenblast came out as transgender in January 2023.

References

External links

Out Of The Sounds Of Jersey, A Familiar Voice Makes A Mosaic - Profile on NPR's All Things Considered, from July 4, 2014
Profile in The New York Times, from February 23, 2012
Video of cornerstone laying ceremony for the Freedom Tower on July 4, 2004
Shadow Traffic Turns 25 - Article from the New York Daily News, from December 7, 2004
City traffic reports are cutting through the gridlock - Article from the Daily News, from December 3, 2009

1956 births
Living people
American transportation businesspeople
American online publication editors
American radio personalities
Businesspeople from Elizabeth, New Jersey
Cranford High School alumni
People from Cranford, New Jersey
Seton Hall University alumni
LGBT people from New Jersey
21st-century American LGBT people